Mount Vernon is a town in Mobile County, Alabama, United States. It is part of the Mobile metropolitan area. It incorporated in 1959. At the 2020 census the population was 1,354.

Geography
Mount Vernon is located in the northeast corner of Mobile County at  (31.093170, -88.011209). U.S. Route 43 passes through the town to the west of its center. US 43 leads south  to Mobile and north  to Jackson.

Cedar Creek, an east-flowing tributary of the Mobile River, passes through the southernmost part of the town.

Demographics

2000 census
At the 2000 census there were 844 people, 333 households, and 228 families in the town. The racial makeup of the town was 45.38% White, 52.96% Black or African American, 0.95% Native American, 0.24% from other races, and 0.47% from two or more races. 0.12% of the population were Hispanic or Latino of any race.
Of the 333 households 28.8% had children under the age of 18 living with them, 50.8% were married couples living together, 14.4% had a female householder with no husband present, and 31.5% were non-families. 30.0% of households were one person and 16.2% were one person aged 65 or older. The average household size was 2.53 and the average family size was 3.19.

The age distribution was 26.2% under the age of 18, 8.6% from 18 to 24, 26.1% from 25 to 44, 22.4% from 45 to 64, and 16.7% 65 or older. The median age was 38 years. For every 100 females, there were 87.1 males. For every 100 females age 18 and over, there were 81.1 males.

The median household income was $29,861 and the median family income  was $36,786. Males had a median income of $30,347 versus $18,750 for females. The per capita income for the town was $12,551. About 19.8% of families and 22.8% of the population were below the poverty line, including 32.9% of those under age 18 and 21.1% of those age 65 or over.

2010 census
At the 2010 census there were 1,574 people, 556 households, and 399 families in the town. The racial makeup of the town was 73.6% Black or African American, 23.4% White, 1.7% Native American, 0.1% from other races, and 1.1% from two or more races. 0.7% of the population were Hispanic or Latino of any race.
Of the 556 households 26.4% had children under the age of 18 living with them, 45.5% were married couples living together, 21.8% had a female householder with no husband present, and 28.2% were non-families. 25.4% of households were one person and 10.2% were one person aged 65 or older. The average household size was 2.72 and the average family size was 3.31.

The age distribution was 23.9% under the age of 18, 8.9% from 18 to 24, 19.9% from 25 to 44, 32.3% from 45 to 64, and 14.9% 65 or older. The median age was 42.3 years. For every 100 females, there were 97.7 males. For every 100 females age 18 and over, there were 101.9 males.

The median household income was $34,722 and the median family income  was $46,111. Males had a median income of $41,250 versus $23,625 for females. The per capita income for the town was $13,790. About 2.7% of families and 26.5% of the population were below the poverty line, including 1.7% of those under age 18 and 18.9% of those age 65 or over.

2020 census

As of the 2020 United States census, there were 1,354 people, 457 households, and 336 families residing in the town.

Education 
The city is served by the Mobile County Public School System. Elementary and middle schoolers go to North Mobile County K-8 near Axis CDP. High schoolers go on to Citronelle High School in Citronelle.

The city's sole public school was the E.T.Belsaw/Mt. Vernon School, which covered grades Kindergarten through 8. In 2006 it had 321 students. From 2010 to 2016 several extracurricular programs at the school were discontinued. It had 98 students in 2016. Gwendolyn Pugh, Mount Vernon Town Councilor, stated that the enrollment drop was due to the extracurricular programs being removed. The county board voted to close the school in 2016.

Historic areas in and around Mt. Vernon
Mount Vernon was home to a historic psychiatric hospital, Searcy Hospital, formerly the site of the Mount Vernon Arsenal. The hospital closed in 2012.

Notable people
 John Kimbrough, former National Football League wide receiver
 William Trent Rossell, Chief of Engineers of the US Army Corps of Engineers in 1913 and former Engineer Commissioner of the District of Columbia

Gallery
Photographs taken in Mount Vernon as part of the Historic American Buildings Survey:

References

Towns in Mobile County, Alabama
Towns in Alabama